Sebree Peak is a mountain in the eastern part of Mitkof Island, one of the islands in the Alexander Archipelago in Alaska. It is named for United States Navy officer and Governor of American Samoa Uriel Sebree. Sebree Island is named for the same officer.

References

Mountains of Alaska
Mitkof Island
Mountains of Petersburg Borough, Alaska
Alexander Archipelago